The New Orleans–Metairie–Hammond combined statistical area is made up of ten parishes in southeastern Louisiana and one county in Mississippi. The statistical area consists of the New Orleans metropolitan statistical area (MSA), Hammond metropolitan statistical area, Picayune micropolitan statistical area (μSA), and the Bogalusa micropolitan statistical area. As of the 2020 census estimates, the CSA had a population of 1,510,672.

The area was severely affected by Hurricane Katrina on August 29, 2005.

Parishes and counties
Louisiana
 Jefferson
 Orleans
 Plaquemines
 St. Bernard
 St. Charles
 St. James
 St. John the Baptist
 St. Tammany
 Tangipahoa
 Washington

Mississippi
 Pearl River

Communities

Places with more than 50,000 inhabitants
 New Orleans (Principal city)
 Kenner
 Metairie (census-designated place)

Places with 10,000 to 50,000 inhabitants

Places with less than 10,000 inhabitants

Demographics
As of the census of 2000, there were 1,360,436 people, 515,054 households, and 347,173 families residing within the CSA. The racial makeup of the CSA was 57.7% White, 37.2% African American, 0.4% Native American, 2.1% Asian, <0.1% Pacific Islander, 1.2% from other races, and 1.4% from two or more races. Hispanic or Latino of any race were 4.3% of the population.

The median income for a household in the CSA was $37,053, and the median income for a family was $42,860. Males had a median income of $35,659 versus $23,150 for females. The per capita income for the CSA was $17,474.

See also
 Louisiana census statistical areas
 List of cities, towns, and villages in Louisiana
 List of census-designated places in Louisiana
Pearl River County, Mississippi

References

Geography of Jefferson Parish, Louisiana
Geography of Orleans Parish, Louisiana
Geography of Plaquemines Parish, Louisiana
Geography of St. Bernard Parish, Louisiana
Geography of St. Charles Parish, Louisiana
Geography of St. James Parish, Louisiana
Geography of St. John the Baptist Parish, Louisiana
Geography of St. Tammany Parish, Louisiana
Geography of Tangipahoa Parish, Louisiana
Geography of Washington Parish, Louisiana
Geography of Pearl River County, Mississippi
Combined statistical areas of the United States